Charli Rae Knott (born 29 November 2002) is an Australian cricketer who plays as a right-handed batter and occasional right-arm off break bowler for Queensland Fire in the Women's National Cricket League (WNCL) and Brisbane Heat in the Women's Big Bash League (WBBL). She played in eight matches for the Heat in the 2020–21 WBBL season. In January 2023, she signed for Wellington Blaze for the remainder of the 2022–23 Super Smash.

References

External links

Charli Knott at Cricket Australia

2002 births
Living people
Cricketers from Queensland
Australian women cricketers
Brisbane Heat (WBBL) cricketers
Queensland Fire cricketers
Wellington Blaze cricketers